Marcin Radzewicz (born 30 June 1980) is a Polish professional footballer who plays as a midfielder for Odra Wodzisław Śląski.

Career
In July 2011, he joined Arka Gdynia on a one-year contract. He also played two times for Poland national football team.

References

External links
 
  

1980 births
People from Jastrzębie-Zdrój
Sportspeople from Silesian Voivodeship
Living people
Polish footballers
Poland international footballers
Association football midfielders
Podbeskidzie Bielsko-Biała players
GKS Jastrzębie players
Piast Gliwice players
Odra Wodzisław Śląski players
Dyskobolia Grodzisk Wielkopolski players
Obra Kościan players
Polonia Bytom players
Arka Gdynia players
GKS Tychy players
Ekstraklasa players
I liga players
II liga players
III liga players